Little Brickhill is a village and civil parish in the unitary authority area of the City of Milton Keynes, Buckinghamshire, England. At the 2011 census, it had a population of 407.

The village name "Brickhill" is a compound of Brythonic and Old English words that have the same meaning: a common occurrence in this part of the country.  The Brythonic word breg means "hill", as does the Old English word hyll.  In the Domesday Book of 1086 the village was referred to as Brichelle. This spelling also occurs in 1422, denoting the place where John Langon was the vicar.

The village has, for a long time, gathered most of its income from the Roman road Watling Street that passes through the parish from north-west to south-east, and anciently from a market that was established in the village in 1228.  At one time the county Assize Courts were held in Little Brickhill, making it adversely larger than nearby Great Brickhill.  The last time the assizes were heard here was in 1638.  Between 1561 and 1620 the names of a number of executed criminals appear in the burial register of the village. The village, being located on a major route to London, was a staging post for mail and passenger stagecoaches. "The Clockhouse" (now converted for residential use) housed just such a staging post, incorporating a stable, office, coach sheds, a hotel and a cowshed. Upon entering the courtyard, grooves can be seen in the cobble stones under the arch that were made by the wheels of countless coaches coming and going.

The village is also the final resting place of Dame V. Bushell (1756-1847), who was most well known for the "Veritas" movement, highlighting the plight of women in the village.

The village had two public houses, The George and The Green Man, but both are closed. , the former has become an Italian restaurant with bar, the latter has been converted to dwellings. The post office that was housed in the village shop closed down in 2008 which precipitated the closure of the shop itself.

The village is home to St. Mary Magdalene CofE parish church.

See also
 Great Brickhill
 Bow Brickhill

References

External links

Little Brickhill community website

Villages in Buckinghamshire
Areas of Milton Keynes
Civil parishes in Buckinghamshire